Fruita Monument High School is a public high school located in Fruita, Colorado, United States, serving 10-12th grades. It is part of Mesa County Valley School District 51.

History
The first purpose-built high school building in Fruita was completed in 1905 under the name Fruita Union High School. After that structure burned down in 1934, classes were held in a local armory. A new building was finished in 1936 and lasted until 1969, when a third location was built under the name Fruita Monument High School.

A 2017 referendum resulted in a $12 million construction project to improve the safety of the school.

Athletics
Wildcat athletic teams are classified as 5A by the Colorado High School Activities Association.

Notable people
Alumni
Jim Brenneman, baseball player
James Niehues, artist and cartographer
Maggie Baird, actress

Faculty
James Van Pelt, author (taught English)

See also
 List of high schools in Colorado

References

External links
 
 Mesa County Valley School District official website

Public high schools in Colorado
Schools in Mesa County, Colorado
Fruita, Colorado
1905 establishments in Colorado
Educational institutions established in 1905